Goethe (also Göthe and Gœthe) is a German surname. It is best known for Johann Wolfgang von Goethe  (1749–1832).
It belongs to the group of surnames derived from given names, in this case given names in Got-, in most cases likely Gottfried (c.f. Götz). Variants of the surname include Göth, Goeth and Göthke, Götke.

The name is comparatively rare; the German phonebook (as of 2013) has 176 entries for Göthe and 168 entries for Goethe; 179 entries for Göth and 28 entries for Goeth; 11 entries for Götke and 2 entries for Göthke.

List of people with the surname
Members of Johann Wolfgang von Goethe's family bearing the surname:
his great-grandfather,  Hans Christian Göthe (fl. 1650s), a blacksmith of Kannawurf, Thuringia, married Sibylla Werner 
his grandfather Friedrich Georg Göthe (6 September 1657 – 10 November 1730), lived in Lyon but in 1685 with the suspension of the Edict of Nantes was forced to move to Frankfurt.
his parents, Johann Caspar Goethe  (29 July 1710 – 25 May 1782) and Catharina Elisabeth Goethe, née Textor  (19 February 1731 - 13 September 1808) 
his wife (m. 1806) and former mistress Christiane von Goethe (1765-1816)  née Vulpius
their son August von Goethe (born out of wedlock 25 December 1789, died 28 October 1830), and his wife Ottilie von Goethe, née von Pogwisch (31 October 1796 – 26 October 1872).

Other people called Goethe, Göthe or Gothe:
 Bror Geijer Göthe  (1892–1949), Swedish artist
 Charles Goethe  (1875–1966), American activist
 Dieter Göthe (fl. 1950s), East German slalom canoer
 Erik Gustaf Göthe (1779 – 1838) Swedish sculptor
 Florian Gothe (born 1962) retired German football defender
 Franz Goethe (1881-1921), Deutsch artist
 Johann Friedrich Eosander von Göthe (1669–1728) — German Late-Baroque architect 
 Jurgen Gothe (1944 - 2015) Canadian radio host
 Matthias Goethe (1827–1876) German-Australian pastor
 Odd Christian Gøthe (1919 - 2002) Norwegian civil servant and politician
 Oliver Goethe (*2004) Danish-German racing driver
 Staffan Göthe (born 1944) Swedish playwright, actor and director

See also
 Goethe (disambiguation)
 Gothe (disambiguation)
 Goth (surname)

References

German-language surnames
Surnames from given names